Babu Baga Busy is a 2017 Indian Telugu-language adult comedy film directed by Naveen Medaram, in his debut, and produced by Abhishek Nama, under Abhishek Pictures. It is the official remake of the 2015 Hindi adult comedy, Hunterrr. The film features Srinivas Avasarala, Mishti, Sreemukhi, Tejaswi Madivada, and Supriya Aysola in lead roles.

Cast
 Srinivas Avasarala as Madhav 'Maddy'
 Mishti as Radha
 Tejaswi Madivada as Parvathi 'Paru' Menon
 Supriya Aysola as Chandrika
 Sreemukhi
 Aadarsh Balakrishna

Soundtrack

Songs were released on E3 Talkies.

See also
 Hunterrr

References

External links
 

2010s Telugu-language films
2017 films
2010s sex comedy films
Indian sex comedy films
Telugu remakes of Hindi films
2017 comedy films